A 988 transaction is a transaction described in section 988(c)(1) of the Internal Revenue Code in the United States of America. This transaction occurs when a taxpayer enters into or acquires any debt instrument, forward contract, futures contract, option, or similar financial instrument held in a non-functional currency. The rules for 988 transactions do not apply to any regulated futures contract or non-equity options which would be marked to market under 26 USCA § 1256 (1256 contract) if held on the last day of the taxable year.

History
The provisions covering 988 transactions were enacted as part of the Tax Reform Act of 1986.

Application
The foreign currency gain or loss on a 988 transaction is treated as ordinary income or loss unless an election is made to treat it as a capital gain or loss.

See also
International taxation
Foreign tax credit

References

External links
IRS publication

0988
United States federal income tax